Providence is a twelve-issue comic book limited series written by Alan Moore and illustrated by Jacen Burrows, published by American company Avatar Press from 2015 to 2017. The story is both a prequel and sequel to Moore's previous stories Neonomicon and The Courtyard, and continues exploring H. P. Lovecraft's Cthulhu Mythos.

Synopsis
The series is set in 1919 and centres on Robert Black, a homosexual Jewish writer,  initially working in New York as a reporter for the New York Herald. Black takes a leave of absence from his journalism career, with the intention of writing a Great American Novel using "the “Outsiders”, perhaps “occult Outsiders”—whom he is on the trail of across New England—as a metaphor for social outsiders".

Plot

I: The Yellow Sign
Gay, Jewish Herald reporter and aspiring novelist Robert Black is sent by his editor, Mr. Posey, to 'scare up' a story about an infamous book called Sous Le Monde, which is rumoured to drive its readers insane. He goes to visit one Doctor Alvarez who once wrote an essay on the subject. Arriving at Alvarez's tenement, the door is answered by the man's landlady and lover, Mrs. Ortega, who shows him upstairs. In Alvarez's heavily air-conditioned apartment, Robert learns that the book mentions 'an early Arab alchemical text' known as Kitab Al-Hikmah Al-Najmiyya ("The Book of Starry Wisdom"), which describes methods of prolonging life. He also learns that Alvarez was provided with a transcript by a man called Suydam. Feeling inspired and intrigued by this story, Robert returns to his office where he learns that his jilted lover, Jonathan, has committed suicide in one of New York's Lethal Chambers.

II: The Hook
Inspired to write his novel, Robert goes on sabbatical from the Herald and heads to Flatbush in search of Suydam. Mr Posey puts him in touch with Detective Tom Malone, who shows him the church where Suydam lectures on occult philosophy. They stake out the churchyard where Suydam often walks, and Malone makes it clear that he's attracted to Robert. Suydam appears, cutting their conversation short, and Robert introduces himself as an occult scholar. Suydam invites Robert to his home to sell him some of his pamphlets and tells him more about the Kitab, a copy of which is held by his suppliers in Salem. He is then called away, and Robert sneaks into his basement where he finds a vast sea cave containing a golden totem and human remains. He is attacked by a glowing female monster and flees, only to lose consciousness. He wakes up to find Suydam standing over him, and he tells him that he must have passed out due to a gas leak. Robert goes on his way, determined to investigate further.

III: A Lurking Fear
Robert checks in at the Hillman hotel, Salem, to locate Tobit Boggs, the man mentioned by Suydam. He walks to the Boggs Refinery where he meets Boggs, who tells him about the occult group Stella Sapiente and that he obtained his transcript of the Kitab from one Garland Wheatley. He shows him a 'rum run' tunnel leading to a chamber connected to the sea where Bogg's grandfather brought in fish people to Salem. That night at his hotel, Robert has a terrible nightmare involving his dead lover Jonathan, Tom Malone, swastikas, gas chambers and fish people. He checks out the next day, and leaves town by bus, noting that the other passengers all look like fish-human hybrids.

IV: White Apes
Robert gets his hair cut in Athol, and learns from his barber about local "medicine man" Garland 'Warlock' Wheatley. Robert walks to the Wheatleys' farm and meets Wheatley himself, who informs him that he parted ways with the Stella Sapiente sect, but that there's a copy of the Kitab in the library at Saint Anselm College. He introduces Robert to his albino daughter, Leticia, and semi-human grandson, Willard. Willard takes an instant dislike to Robert, having perceived that Robert is "aht uv a diff'run' story awlduhgethuh". He leaves Robert in his shed and, unbenknowst to Robert, intends to feed him to his invisible, monster brother. Aware of Robert's danger, Garland Wheatley sees him off the property and warns him not to cut across the fields on his way back to town.

V: In The Walls
Robert gets a ride with a Mr. Jenkins to Manchester, New Hampshire, where he intends to visit Saint Anselm College to read its copy of the Kitab. He's shown around the college by Father Walter Race, who tells him there are government agents in the area investigating a fallen meteorite. He also meets an assistant from the medical department, Hector North, who invites him to stay with him and his 'friend', James Montague, if he fails to find lodgings in Goffs Falls. On the way to find lodgings, he meets precociously intelligent 13-year-old, Elspeth, who suggests he tries Mrs. Macey's boarding house. Robert rents a room there, then visits Agent Frank Stubbs and his men who are investigating where the meteorite came down. Going to bed that night, Robert experiences terrifying false awakening nightmares involving Mrs. Macey and a rat-like version of Mr. Jenkins. He packs his bags and goes to Hector North's house, unaware of his new danger.

VI: Out Of Time
Robert wakes from bad dreams, and James cooks breakfast for him and Hector. James and Hector argue over Hector's desire to kill Robert and reanimate him, but Robert mistakes their bickering for James being sexually jealous. Elspeth delivers a message from the college to their front door, which alarms James and Hector enough that they pack and leave town immediately. Elspeth walks Robert back to Saint Anselm College and suggests they meet again later. Father Race takes Robert to meet Dr. Henry Wantage, who guides him to the library and shows him a photograph of the members of Stella Sapiente, which includes the late Edgar Wade, Elspeth's father. Robert reads the Kitab, and his perception of time becomes distorted. He parts company with Wantage and finds Elspeth waiting for him. She takes him back to her lodgings and the Being that possesses Elspeth swaps bodies with Robert and rapes him in Elspeth's body. Afterward, the Being swaps bodies back again and 'Elspeth' sends a traumatized Robert on his way. Running through the rain, a car passes him in which he can see Mr. Jenkins driving him into Manchester for the first time.

VII: The Picture
Robert finds himself in the middle of a riot during the Boston Police Strike. An off-duty policeman, Eamon O'Brien, shows him to the home of artist and photographer, Ronald Underwood Pitman, who took the photograph of the members of Stella Sapiente at Saint Anselm College. O'Brien stays for a drink and Pitman puts up Robert for the night. The next day, Pitman reveals some of the identities of the people in the photograph to Robert. Robert catches a glimpse of one of Pitman's horrific paintings of ghouls attacking commuters on a subway, and Pitman offers to show him his 'technique' in the hope it will make Robert better understand his perilous situation. He takes him down to his basement and introduces him to a ghoul called King George. Afterward, Robert convinces himself that Pitman has merely demonstrated the same form of hypnotic suggestion which he believes Elspeth must have used on him. Pitman realizes he's failed to make Robert understand the truth and suggests he visit local author Randall Carver, whom he hopes might do a better job. Robert bids him a fond farewell and heads on his way. Pitman goes into his dark room and develops a photograph of three ghouls posing with the dead body of Eamon O'Brien.

VIII: The Key
Robert has spent several weeks staying with Randall Carver discussing the relationship between dreams and art. He has also discovered, in an amateur publication called Pine Cones, a writer of weird fiction he particularly admires named H. P. Lovecraft. Carver demonstrates to Robert the power of dreams by taking him into the Dreamlands, where they meet a group of cats who carry them up towards the moon before they are snatched and dropped by a flock of Nightgaunts. On waking, Carver takes Robert into town to a literary event with Lord Dunsany as its guest speaker. To Robert's delight, one of the other attendees is none other than Howard Lovecraft himself. The unwitting Robert introduces himself to Lovecraft, and it becomes ominously apparent that their meeting has been pre-ordained by dark forces.

IX: Outsiders
Robert arrives in Providence to meet Henry Annesley, a scientist who has developed a pair of spectacles through which he can see the extra-dimensional organisms which overlap our plane of reality. Annesley, a member of Stella Sapiente, tells Robert some of the group's history, and introduces him to Howard Charles, a young genealogist. Annesley observes that Robert and Howard are sexually attracted to each other, and suggests Howard show Robert some of the local landmarks associated with the 'Stell Saps'. Howard takes Robert to St. John's Church where occult meetings were once held in the steeple. They go inside and discover a shining trapezohedron in a box, in fact the very same meteorite that fell to earth in Manchester. Howard seduces Robert, and they have sex while looking into the alien stone. Afterwards, Robert calls on H. P. Lovecraft at his home. Lovecraft helps Robert find lodgings, and then Robert accompanies him to visit his mother in the mental hospital. Robert waits while Lovecraft sees his mother and pretends not to overhear their exchange. Lovecraft rejoins him and they depart. Lovecraft's mother looks on after them, and sees the same weird creatures in the air that Annesley does through his spectacles.

X: The Haunted Palace
Robert and Lovecraft discuss how Poe and Dunsany influenced Lovecraft's early work, and Lovecraft admits that reading about Robert's strange experiences in his commonplace book has inspired him further. Robert's liking for Lovecraft evaporates when he expresses both his homophobia and antisemitism, and he soon comes to realize that the unwitting Lovecraft's father, Winfield Scott Lovecraft, and maternal grandfather, Whipple Van Buren Phillips, were both members of Stella Sapiente. Believing that Lovecraft has been ordained by the occult group to be their 'Redeemer', Robert panics and returns to his lodgings. He writes a letter to Tom Malone, in which he warns him about everything he has discovered on his travels, unaware that the steeple window of St. John's Church appears to be getting nearer and nearer his own. Suddenly, Johnny Carcosa (an avatar of Nyarlathotep) appears in the room and confirms that Robert has helped to fulfill a prophecy in which H. P. Lovecraft's stories will bring about the apocalypse. In gratitude, Carcosa kneels before Robert and fellates him.

XI: The Unnameable
Robert takes the train back to New York and mails the letter to Malone before going to commit suicide in the same Lethal Chamber as his former lover, Jonathan. H.P. Lovecraft's career gains momentum and all his stories merge with reality: Tom Malone goes mad after the events of The Horror at Red Hook; Lovecraft marries; the events of The Dunwich Horror, The Case of Charles Dexter Ward, The Thing on the Doorstep and The Shadow Over Innsmouth play out; Lovecraft makes the acquaintance of August Derleth; Robert E. Howard shoots himself; Lovecraft dies and Derleth becomes his executor rather than Robert Barlow; in the 1970s, hippies discover Lovecraft's work; the Kitab is marketed as the 'real' Necronomicon; belief in the occult power of the Necronomicon spreads; Cthulhu plushies go on sale. Then the events of The Courtyard and Neonomicon come to pass... and then the Cthulian apocalypse begins.

XII: The Book
At the FBI, Carl Perlman concludes that all Lovecraft's fiction, its criticism, and Robert Black's testament have acted as the conduit through which an outside force has taken purchase on humanity's collective unconscious to a point where it can change reality. Word has reached the FBI that a pregnant-looking Merril Brears has sprung Aldo Sax from his asylum, and Perlman wonders if they might find them at Saint Anselm College. He drives to Manchester but instead finds himself in 'Lovecraft Country'. At Miskatonic University, he learns that Brears and Sax have been and gone, and taken the Kitab with them. Continuing on foot to Arkham, he finds a delegation waiting which includes Brears, Sax, some Mi-Go, a woman 'housing' a member of the Great Race of Yith, and Lovecraftian scholar S. T. Joshi. In the sky above them floats Azathoth. Johnny Carcosa appears, and Brears goes into labour, giving birth to the infant Cthulhu. Carcosa sets the babe into the river as Brears, Perlman, and Joshi look on from the bridge. Perlman wonders if there's anything in Black's commonplace book that might help them reverse the situation, but Brears and Joshi are skeptical. As Shub-Niggurath glides slowly towards the place where they're standing, Perlman rips the book in half and scatters its pages into the water.

Publication history

Alan Moore heavily researched the series; in a six-month period he acquired "nearly every book of [Lovecraft] criticism that’s been written".

Collected editions
The series is being collected into individual volumes:

Providence Act 1 Limited Edition Hardcover (collects Providence #1–4, Avatar Press, 160 pages, May 2016, 978-1592912810)
Providence Act 2 Limited Edition Hardcover (collects Providence #5–8, Avatar Press, 176 pages, June 2017, 978-1592912926)
Providence Act 3 Limited Edition Hardcover (collects Providence #9–12, Avatar Press, 144 pages, September 2017, 978-1592912933)

Reception
The series has met with critical acclaim, holding an average score of 9.3 out of 10 at review aggregator website Comic Book Roundup.

The first volume received a nomination for the 2016 Bram Stoker Award for Best Graphic Novel.

References

External links
 Providence at Avatar Press
 
 
 
 
 

Rhode Island in fiction
LGBT-related comics
Works about H. P. Lovecraft
Works about journalists
Comics set in the 1910s
Adaptations of works by H. P. Lovecraft
Comics by Alan Moore
Horror comics
Historical comics
Prequel comics
New Hampshire in fiction
Cthulhu Mythos comics
Comics set in New York City
Comics set in Massachusetts